Walloon is a  town and rural residential locality in the City of Ipswich, Queensland, Australia. In the  the locality of Walloon had a population of 1,588 people.

Geography 
The locality is bounded to the north by the Warrego Highway and to the south by the Bremer River. The town is roughly in the centre of the locality. The Rosewood railway line enters the locality from the east (Karrabin), passes through the town which is served by the Walloon railway station, and then exits to the south-west (Thagoona).

The centre and eastern parts of the locality are rural residential while the land use in the western part of the locality is predominantly grazing on native vegetation.

History 
The origin of the suburb name is thought to refer to the French-speaking area of southern Belgium known as Wallonia.

Guilfoyles Creek Non Vested School was opened in 1865 by the Catholic Church. It may have closed and reopened but is believed to have closed permanently when Walloon State School opened in 1877.

A German Lutheran Church opened in Walloon near the railway station on Wednesday 9 July 1873.

In July 1873 the Queensland Government reserved  at Walloon for a "national school" (the former name for "state school"). In October 1876 the government called for tenders to construct a primary school at Walloon. The foundations for the school building were in place by February 1877. Walloon State School opened on 9 July 1877.

On Saturday 21 April 1891, sisters Bridget Kate and Mary Jane Broderick (aged 9 and 6 respectively) were drowned in a waterhole near their home in Walloon. Poet Henry Lawson wrote a poem called The Babies of Walloon based on their deaths. In 2006, a sculpture depicting the Broderick sisters playing was unveiled in the Henry Lawson Bicentennial Park in Walloon. In 2015, a new headstone was erected of the children's grave in Ipswich General Cemetery.

In the 2011 census, Walloon had a population of 1,548 people.

In the  the locality of Walloon had a population of 1,588 people.

Transport

Walloon railway station provides Queensland Rail City network services to Rosewood, Ipswich and Brisbane via Ipswich.

Education
Walloon State School is a government primary (Prep-6) school for boys and girls at Karrabin-Rosewood Road. In 2018, the school had an enrolment of 234 students with 19 teachers (16 full-time equivalent) and 17 non-teaching staff (10 full-time equivalent). It includes a special education program.

There is no secondary school in the Walloon. The nearest government secondary schools are Ipswich State High School in Brassall, Ipswich, to the east and Rosewood State High School in Rosewood to the south-west.

Amenities 
The Ipswich City Council operates a fortnightly mobile library service which visits Queen Street.

The Walloon branch of the Queensland Country Women's Association meets at 534 Karrabin-Rosewood Road.

There are a number of parks in Walloon, including:

 Five Mile Creek Park
 Henry Lawson Bicentennial Park

 Poplar Street Reserve

 Suncrest Park

 Tallwood Park

Local shops

Walloon has an array of small businesses. The businesses available include:
 Take-away food
 Hairdresser
 Real Estate Agent
 Medical Centre
 Chemist
 The historical Walloon Saloon
 Walloon IGA
 Walloon Bakery
 Dentist
 Service Station

References

Further reading

External links

 
 

 
City of Ipswich
Localities in Queensland